Alukandeh (also Romanized as Ālūkandeh; also known as ‘Alī Kandeh) is a village in Qareh Toghan Rural District, in the Central District of Neka County, Mazandaran Province, Iran. At the 2006 census, its population was 797, in 181 families.

References 

Populated places in Neka County